Ponir Uddin Ahmed is a Jatiya Party (Ershad) politician and the incumbent Member of Parliament of Kurigram-2.

Career
Ahmed was elected to parliament from Kurigram-2 as a Jatiya Party (Ershad) candidate 30 December 2018.

References

Jatiya Party politicians
Living people
11th Jatiya Sangsad members
1957 births